Michna is a surname. Notable people with the surname include:

Adrian Michna, American musician
Lukáš Michna (born 1990), Czech footballer
Marta Michna (born 1978), Polish chess player
Russ Michna (born 1981), American football player

See also
Adam Václav Michna z Otradovic (1600–1676), Czech poet